Jesper Kyd Jakobson (born 3 February 1972) is a Danish composer and sound designer who has worked on various video game, television, and film projects. He has composed soundtracks for the Hitman series, Assassin's Creed series, Borderlands series, Darksiders II and State of Decay, among many others. His scores use orchestra, choir, acoustic manipulations and electronic soundscapes.

Biography

Early years
Kyd started playing the piano at an early age. Later, he took several years of training in classical guitar, note reading, choir singing and classical composition for piano. However, he is mostly self-taught. Kyd started using computers for composing on a Commodore 64 at age 14, and later an Amiga. He and Mikael Balle became members of the demogroup Silents DK, and later started collaborating with a group of coders known as Crionics. They eventually made the Amiga demoscene production Hardwired. Kyd also created and scored the first wild demo, Global Trash 2, together with Mikael Balle.

Kyd then left the demoscene and started to work as a game musician. He and others created the computer game developer Zyrinx and a game called Sub-Terrania for the Sega Genesis. The team then relocated to Boston. Kyd composed music for two additional Zyrinx titles, Red Zone and Scorcher and the music for two externally developed games, Amok and The Adventures of Batman and Robin for the Sega Genesis. Zyrinx dissolved when their game publisher Scavenger went bankrupt.

Freelance
Many former Zyrinx members returned to Denmark to start IO Interactive, but Kyd moved to New York City and set up his own sound studio in Manhattan called "Nano studios". He then worked as a freelance video game musician.

The soundtrack to Hitman: Codename 47 was based on urban soundscapes and ethnic instrumentation. He then recorded the soundtrack of Hitman 2: Silent Assassin with 110 musicians of the Budapest Symphony Orchestra and Hungarian Radio Choir.

He recorded the score for the action/adventure Freedom Fighters with the Hungarian Radio choir. It was described by Film Score Monthly Magazine as "Vangelis on steroids".

He used modern electronica and symphonic and choral music in Hitman: Contracts. Kyd followed up with Hitman: Blood Money, also performed by the Budapest Symphony Orchestra and Hungarian Radio Choir. 

Kyd then provided a cinematic middle eastern-based score for Ubisoft's Assassin's Creed. He then wrote music for several games in the Assassin's Creed and Borderlands franchise. Kyd also wrote the soundtrack for the action/adventure Darksiders II, notable for being his first entirely non-digital score. 

Kyd lives in Burbank, California and is represented by The Gorfaine/Schwartz Agency, Inc. 

Jesper Kyd's influences include composers such as Ottorino Respighi, Igor Stravinsky, Jean-Michel Jarre, Vangelis, Mike Oldfield, John Williams, Jerry Goldsmith, and bands such as Röyksopp, the Knife, Pink Floyd, and Underworld.

Works

Video games

Films

Short films

TV series

Awards

Nominations

References

External links

Artist profile at OverClocked ReMix

1972 births
Ambient musicians
BAFTA winners (people)
Danish electronic musicians
Danish film score composers
Demosceners
Electronica musicians
Intelligent dance musicians
Living people
Male film score composers
Male television composers
People from Hørsholm Municipality
Television composers
Tracker musicians
Video game composers
La-La Land Records artists